Parkway Village may refer to:

Parkway Village, Kentucky
Parkway Village, New Jersey
Parkway Village (Queens), New York City 
Parkway Village, Memphis, Tennessee
Parkway Villages, Houston, Texas